Cyphura is a genus of moths in the family Uraniidae. The genus was erected by William Warren in 1902.

Distribution
The genus includes primarily nocturnal or crepuscular moths that are found in the Australasian tropical areas. Species have a generally pale or nearly-white colouration with brown or dark patterns.
The larvae live in webbing of the host plant.

Species
 Cyphura albisecta Warren
 Cyphura approximans Swinhoe, 1916
 Cyphura atramentaria Warren
 Cyphura bifasciata Butler, 1879
 Cyphura catenulata Warren, 1902
 Cyphura caudiferaria Boisduval
 Cyphura clarissima Butler
 Cyphura costalis Butler
 Cyphura dealbata Warren
 Cyphura destrigata Kirsch 
 Cyphura extensa Rothschild
 Cyphura falka Swinhoe
 Cyphura geminia (Cramer, 1777) (Ambon Island)
 Cyphura gutturalis Swinhoe, 1916
 Cyphura latimarginata Swinhoe, 1902 
 Cyphura maxima Strand
 Cyphura multistrigaria Warren
 Cyphura mundaria Walker
 Cyphura pannata Felder
 Cyphura pardata Warren
 Cyphura phantasma Felder
 Cyphura pieridaria Warren, 1902
 Cyphura reducta Joicey & Talbot
 Cyphura semialba Warren
 Cyphura semiobsoleta Warren
 Cyphura subsimilis Warren, 1902
 Cyphura swinhoei Joicey, 1917
 Cyphura urapteroides Joicey

References

External links

Uraniidae - Yale University

Uraniidae